Anisopodus curvipes is a species of beetle in the family Cerambycidae that was described by Martins in 1974.

References

Anisopodus
Beetles described in 1974